Hilda Saeed (born 1936) is a Pakistani activist and freelance journalist. She is chair of Shirkat Gah (Women's Resource Center) and a founding member of the Women's Action Forum (WAF) in Pakistan and of the Pakistan Reproductive Health Network.

Activities 
Saeed is a Christian married to a Muslim. Saeed began her career by teaching at an undergraduate university for eighteen years. She worked as a medical researcher, forensic serologist, and also as a journalist. Saeed helped women and members of minority communities through legal Proceedings. Saeed's only daughter is also an active feminist.

Saeed became a women's rights activist in 1978, joining the  Shirkat Gah (Women's Resource Center)  and becoming its chair. She was a founding member of the Women's Action Forum, and of the Pakistan Reproductive Health Network, which raised issues related to sexual rights. Saeed has represented Pakistan in many international forums.

She was a member of HERA (Health, Empowerment, Rights & Accountability), an international group of women health activists who produced a set of Action Sheets "to ensure implementation of the Programme of Action produced by the International Conference on Population and Development held in Cairo in 1994".]

References

External links 
Official Website of Shirkat Gah

1936 births
Living people
Pakistani women activists
Pakistani women's rights activists
Pakistani Christians